Ste. Anne is a rural municipality in the Eastman Region of Manitoba, Canada, lying southeast of Winnipeg. The separately-administered town of Ste. Anne lies within the geographic borders of the municipality, in its northwestern part.

It includes Paradise Village, a 55-plus retirement community, founded in early 1990, many of whose residents are "snowbirds". The municipality has five privately-owned public golf courses—Cottonwood, Oakwood, Ridgewood, Girouxsalem, and Quarry Oaks—and five privately-owned campgrounds—Lilac, Wild Oaks, Rock Garden, Ridgewood and Cherry Hill.

The municipality is one of the earliest-settled areas of Manitoba.

History 
The first settlers of Ste. Anne arrived in 1856 at Pointe-des-Chênes ('where the oaks meet') from Quebec in search of farmland. The main industry within this initial settlement to the area, which included 198 families, was purposed towards supplying lumber for the construction of the Saint Boniface Cathedral. By the end of the decade, the Hudson's Bay Company established a trading post in the community, which eventually brought the settlement a hotel, general store, and a jail.

The Rural Municipality of Ste. Anne was incorporated in February 1881, but soon after amalgamated with the Rural Municipality of LaBroquerie in 1890. Nearly two decades later, in 1908 the RM of Ste. Anne became re-established by an Act of the Legislature.

Communities
 Giroux
 Greenland, Manitoba
 La Coulée
 Richer
 St. Raymond

Demographics 
In the 2021 Census of Population conducted by Statistics Canada, Ste.

See also
 Laurie Evans
Seine River (Manitoba)

References

External links
 Official website
 Map of Ste. Anne R.M. at Statcan
Community Profile: Ste. Anne Rural Municipality, Manitoba; Statistics Canada

Rural municipalities in Manitoba